Zion Kenan (born 1955), is the former Chief Executive Officer of Bank Hapoalim, Israel.

Early life and career
Kenan was named CEO of Bank Hapoalim. During his tenure, the bank focused on innovation and technology.

References

Israeli bankers
1955 births
Living people
Open University of Israel alumni
Place of birth missing (living people)